The 1999 Vuelta a Andalucía was the 45th edition of the Vuelta a Andalucía (Ruta del Sol) cycle race and was held on 14 February to 18 February 1999. The race started in Almeria and finished in Granada. The race was won by Javier Pascual Rodríguez.

Teams
Nineteen teams of up to eight riders started the race:

 
 
 
 
 
 
 
 
 
 
 
 
 Nürnberger
 Palmans–Ideal
 
 
 
 Team Cologne

General classification

References

Vuelta a Andalucia
Vuelta a Andalucía by year
1999 in Spanish sport